Dmitri Vasilyevich Zinovich (born on 19 May 1989) is a Russian footballer who plays as a midfielder for FC Murom.

Career
Zinovich made his professional debut for FC Saturn Moscow Oblast on 14 July 2010 in the Russian Cup game against FC Sakhalin Yuzhno-Sakhalinsk.

External links
  Player page on the official FC Shinnik Yaroslavl website
 

1989 births
Living people
People from Murom
Russian footballers
Russia youth international footballers
Association football midfielders
FC Shinnik Yaroslavl players
FC Saturn Ramenskoye players
PFC Spartak Nalchik players
Russian Premier League players
FC Baltika Kaliningrad players
FC Sokol Saratov players
FC Sakhalin Yuzhno-Sakhalinsk players
FC Khimik Dzerzhinsk players
FC Lokomotiv Moscow players
FC Torpedo Vladimir players
Sportspeople from Vladimir Oblast